Jarka is a river of Poland. It is the upper course of the river Gołdapa, upstream from Lake Gołdap, near Gołdap.

Rivers of Poland
Rivers of Warmian-Masurian Voivodeship